Thure Erik Lund (born 27 June 1959 in Vikersund) is a Norwegian author and cabinet maker. He debuted in 1992 with the novel Tanger, for which he won Tarjei Vesaas' debutantpris.

Bibliography 
Tanger – novel (1992)
Leiegården – novel (1994)
Zalep – novel (1995)
Grøftetildragelsesmysteriet – novel (1999)
Om naturen – essays (2000)
Compromateria – novel (2002)
Forgreininger – erotic essays (2003)
Elvestengfolket (The River Trappers) – novel (2003)
Språk og natur – essay (2005)
Uranophilia – novel (2005)
Inn – novel (2006)
Om de nye norske byene og andre essays – essays (2006)
Compromateria – novel (2009)
Identitet – novel (2017)

Prizes 
Tarjei Vesaas' debutantpris 1992, for Tanger
Sult-prisen 2000, for Grøftetildragelsesmysteriet
Mads Wiel Nygaards Endowment 2003
Kritikerprisen 2005, for Uranophilia
Dobloug Prize 2009
Aschehoug Prize 2009

References

1959 births
Living people
People from Modum
20th-century Norwegian novelists
21st-century Norwegian novelists
Norwegian Critics Prize for Literature winners
Dobloug Prize winners